Allan Widman (born 1964) is a Swedish Liberal People's Party politician, member of the Riksdag since 2002.

References

1964 births
21st-century Swedish politicians
Living people
Members of the Riksdag 2002–2006
Members of the Riksdag 2006–2010
Members of the Riksdag 2010–2014
Members of the Riksdag 2014–2018
Members of the Riksdag 2018–2022
Members of the Riksdag from the Liberals (Sweden)